Benzyltriethylammonium hydroxide is a quaternary ammonium salt that functions as an organic base.

Uses
Together with benzyltrimethylammonium hydroxide, salts of benzyltriethylammonium are common phase-transfer catalysts.

References 

Hydroxides
Quaternary ammonium compounds
Reagents for organic chemistry
Benzyl compounds